() is a racial classification to refer to people of mixed African and European ancestry. Its use is considered outdated and offensive in several languages, including English and Dutch, whereas in languages such as Spanish and Portuguese is not, and can even be a source of pride. A  is a female mulatto.

Etymology

The English term and spelling mulatto is derived from the Spanish and Portuguese . It was a common term in the Southeastern United States during the era of slavery. Some sources suggest that it may derive from the Portuguese word  (from the Latin ), meaning 'mule', the hybrid offspring of a horse and a donkey. The term is now generally considered outdated and offensive in non-Spanish and non-Portuguese speaking countries, and was considered offensive even in the 19th century.

Jack D. Forbes suggests it originated in the Arabic term muwallad, which means 'a person of mixed ancestry'.  literally means 'born, begotten, produced, generated; brought up', with the implication of being born and raised among Arabs, but not of Arab blood.  is derived from the root word  (Arabic: , direct Arabic transliteration: ,) and colloquial Arabic pronunciation can vary greatly.  means 'descendant, offspring, scion; child; son; boy; young animal, young one'.

In al-Andalus,  referred to the offspring of non-Arab Muslim people who adopted the Islamic religion and manners. Specifically, the term was historically applied to the descendants of indigenous Christian Iberians who, after several generations of living among a Muslim majority, adopted their culture and religion. Notable examples of this category include the famous Muslim scholar Ibn Hazm. According to Lisan al-Arab, one of the earliest Arab dictionaries (c. 13th century AD), applied the term to the children of non-Muslim (often Christian) slaves or non-Muslim children who were captured in a war and were raised by Muslims to follow their religion and culture. Thus, in this context, the term  has a meaning close to 'the adopted'. According to the same source, the term does not denote being of mixed-race but rather being of foreign-blood and local culture.

In English, printed usage of mulatto dates to at least the 16th century. The 1595 work Drake's Voyages first used the term in the context of intimate unions producing biracial children. The Oxford English Dictionary defined mulatto as "one who is the offspring of a European and a Black". This earliest usage regarded "black" and "white" as discrete "species", with the "mulatto" constituting a third separate "species".

These sources specify that  would have been derived directly from  independently of the related word muladí, a term that was applied to Iberian Christians who had converted to Islam during the Moorish governance of Iberia in the Middle Ages.

The Real Academia Española (Spanish Royal Academy) casts doubt on the  theory.

Scholars such as Werner Sollors cast doubt on the mule etymology for mulatto. In the 18th and 19th centuries, racialists such as Edward Long and Josiah Nott began to assert that mulattoes were sterile like mules. They projected this belief back onto the etymology of the word mulatto. Sollors points out that this etymology is anachronistic: "The Mulatto sterility hypothesis that has much to do with the rejection of the term by some writers is only half as old as the word 'Mulatto'."

Africa

Of São Tomé and Príncipe's 193,413 inhabitants, the largest segment is classified as mestiço, or mixed race. 71% of the population of Cape Verde is also classified as such. The great majority of their current populations descend from unions between the Portuguese, who colonized the islands from the 15th century onward, and black Africans they brought from the African mainland to work as slaves. In the early years, mestiços began to form a third-class between the Portuguese colonists and African slaves, as they were usually bilingual and often served as interpreters between the populations.

In Angola and Mozambique, the  constitute smaller but still important minorities; 2% in Angola and 0.2% in Mozambique.

The persistence of some authors in using this term, anachronistically, reflects the old-school essentialist views of race as a de facto biological phenomenon, and the 'mixing' of race as legitimate grounds for the creation of a 'new race'. This disregards cultural, linguistic and ethnic diversity and/or differences between regions and globally among populations of mixed ancestry.

In Namibia, an ethnic group known as Rehoboth Basters, descend from historic liaisons between the Cape Colony Dutch and indigenous African women. The name Baster is derived from the Dutch word for 'bastard' (or 'crossbreed'). While some people consider this term demeaning, the Basters proudly use the term as an indication of their history. In the early 21st century, they number between 20,000 and 30,000 people. There are, of course, other people of mixed race in the country.

South Africa

In South Africa, Coloured is a term used to refer to individuals with some degree of sub-Saharan ancestry but subjectively 'not enough' to be considered 'black' under the Apartheid era law of South Africa. Today these people self-identify as 'Coloured'. Under Apartheid law through the latter half of the 20th century, the government established seven categories of Coloured people: Cape Coloured, Cape Malay, Griqua and Other Coloured – the aim of subdivisions was to enhance the meaning of the larger category of Coloured by making it all encompassing. Legally and politically speaking, all people of colour were classified "black" in the non-racial terms of anti-Apartheid rhetoric of the Black Consciousness Movement.

In addition to European ancestry, the Coloured people usually had some portion of Asian ancestry from immigrants from India, Indonesia, Madagascar, Malaysia, Mauritius, Sri Lanka, China and/or Saint Helena. Based on the Population Registration Act to classify people, the government passed laws prohibiting mixed marriages.  Many people who classified as belonging to the "Asian" category could legally intermarry with "mixed-race" people because they shared the same nomenclature. There was extensive combining of these diverse heritages in the Western Cape.

In other parts of South Africa and neighboring states, the coloured usually were descendants of two primary ethnic groups - primarily Africans of various tribes and European colonists of various tribes, with generations of coloured forming families. The use of the term Coloured has changed over the course of history. For instance, in the first census after the South African war (1912), Indians were counted as 'Coloured'. But before and after this war, they were counted as 'Asiatic'.

In KwaZulu-Natal, most Coloureds (that were classified as "other coloureds") had British and Zulu heritage. Zimbabwean coloureds were descended from Shona or Ndebele mixing with British and Afrikaner settlers.

Griqua, on the other hand, are descendants of Khoisan and Afrikaner trekboers, with contributions from central Southern African groups. The Griqua were subjected to an ambiguity of other creole people within Southern African social order. According to Nurse and Jenkins (1975), the leader of this "mixed" group, Adam Kok I, was a former slave of the Dutch governor. He was manumitted and provided land outside Cape Town in the eighteenth century. With territories beyond the Dutch East India Company administration, Kok provided refuge to deserting soldiers, refugee slaves, and remaining members of various Khoikhoi tribes.

Afro-European tribes and clans
Akus
Americo-Liberians
Amaros
Fernandinos
Gold Coast Euro-Africans
 Saro people
 Sherbro Hubris
Sherbro Tuckers
 Sherbro Caulkers
 Sherbro Rogers
 Sherbro Clevelands
Sierra Leone Creole people

Latin America and the Caribbean

Mulattoes in colonial South America

Africans were transported by Portuguese slave traders to South America starting in the early 16th century. Offspring of Spaniards and African women resulted early on in mixed-race children, termed mulattoes. In Spanish law, the status of the child followed that of the mother, so that despite having a Spanish parent, their offspring were enslaved. The label mulatto was recorded in official colonial documentation, so that marriage registers, censuses, and court documents allow research on different aspects of mulattoes’ lives. Although some legal documents simply label a person a mulatto/a, other designations occurred. In the sales of casta slaves in 17th-century Mexico City, official notaries recorded gradations of skin color in the transactions. These were usually American-born slaves. Darker mulatto slaves were often termed  or sometimes .

There was considerable malleability and manipulation of racial labeling, including the seemingly stable category of mulatto. In a case that came before the Mexican Inquisition, a woman publicly identified as a mulatta was described by a Spanish priest, Diego Xaimes Ricardo Villavicencio, as "a white  with curly hair, because she is the daughter of a dark-skinned  and a Spaniard, and for her manner of dress she has flannel petticoats and a native blouse (huipil), sometimes silken, sometimes woolen. She wears shoes, and her natural and common language is not Spanish, but Chocho [an indigenous Mexican language], as she was brought up among Indians with her mother, from which she contracted the vice of drunkenness, to which she often succumbs, as Indians do, and from them she has also received the crime of [idolatry]." Community members were interrogated as to their understanding of her racial standing. Her mode of dress, very wavy hair and light skin confirmed for one witness that she was a mulatta. Even though the accused had physical features of a mulatta, her cultural category was more important. In colonial Latin America,  could also refer to an individual of mixed African and Native American ancestry, but the term zambo was more consistently used for that racial mixture.

Dominican friar Thomas Gage spent over a decade in the Viceroyalty of New Spain in the early 17th century; he converted to Anglicanism and later wrote of his travels, often disparaging Spanish colonial society and culture. In Mexico City, he observed in considerable detail the opulence of dress of women, writing that "The attire of this baser sort of people of blackamoors and mulattoes (which are of a mixed nature, of Spaniards and blackamoors) is so light, and their carriage so enticing, that many Spaniards even of the better sort (who are too too [sic] prone to venery) disdain their wives for them... Most of these are or have been slaves, though love have set them loose, at liberty to enslave souls to sin and Satan."

In the late 18th century, some mixed-race persons sought legal "certificates of whiteness", in order to rise socially and practice professions.  American-born Spaniards (criollos) sought to prevent the approval of such petitions, since the "purity" of their own whiteness would be in jeopardy.  They asserted their "purity of blood" (limpieza de sangre) as white persons who had "always been known, held and commonly reputed to be white persons, Old Christians of the nobility, clean of all bad blood and without any mixture of commoner, Jew, Moor, Mulatto, or converso in any degree, no matter how remote."  Spaniards both American- and Iberian-born discriminated against pardos and mulattoes because of their "bad blood." One Cuban sought the grant of his petition in order to practice as a surgeon, a profession from which he was barred because of his mulatto designation. Royal laws and decrees prevented pardos and mulattoes from serving as a public notary, lawyer, pharmacist, ordination to the priesthood, or graduation from university. Mulattas declared white could marry a Spaniard.

Gallery

Mulattoes in the modern era

Brazil

Many mixed-race Brazilians have varying degrees of European, Amerindian and Afrian ancestry.

Puerto Rico

A person with African ancestry could be considered legally white if he could prove that at least one person per generation in the last four generations had been legally white. People of black ancestry with known white lineage were classified as white, in contrast to the "one-drop rule" put into law in the early 20th century in the United States. In colonial and antebellum times in certain locations, persons of three-quarters or more white ancestry were considered legally white.

United States

Colonial and Antebellum eras

Historians have documented sexual abuse of enslaved women during the colonial and post-revolutionary slavery times by white men in power: planters, their sons before marriage, overseers, etc., which resulted in many multiracial children born into slavery. Starting with Virginia in 1662, colonies adopted the principle of partus sequitur ventrem in slave law, which said that children born in the colony were born into the status of their mother. Thus, children born to slave mothers were born into slavery, regardless of who their fathers were and whether they were baptized as Christians. Children born to white mothers were free, even if they were mixed-race. Children born to free mixed-race mothers were also free.

Paul Heinegg has documented that most of the free people of color listed in the 1790–1810 censuses in the Upper South were descended from unions and marriages during the colonial period in Virginia between white women, who were free or indentured servants, and African or African American men, servant, slave or free. In the early colonial years, such working-class people lived and worked closely together, and slavery was not as much of a racial caste. Slave law had established that children in the colony took the status of their mothers. This meant that multi-racial children born to white women were born free. The colony required them to serve lengthy indentures if the woman was not married, but nonetheless, numerous individuals with African ancestry were born free, and formed more free families. Over the decades, many of these free people of color became leaders in the African-American community; others married increasingly into the white community. His findings have been supported by DNA studies and other contemporary researchers as well.

A daughter born to a South Asian father and Irish mother in Maryland in 1680, both of whom probably came to the colony as indentured servants, was classified as a "mulatto" and sold into slavery.

Historian F. James Davis says,

Historically in the American South, the term mulatto was also applied at times to persons with mixed Native American and African American ancestry. For example, a 1705 Virginia statute reads as follows: 
"And for clearing all manner of doubts which hereafter may happen to arise upon the construction of this act, or any other act, who shall be accounted a mulatto, Be it enacted and declared, and it is hereby enacted and declared, That the child of an Indian and the child, grand child, or great grand child, of a negro shall be deemed, accounted, held and taken to be a mulatto."However, southern colonies began to prohibit Indian slavery in the eighteenth century, so, according to their own laws, even mixed-race children born to Native American women should be considered free. The societies did not always observe this distinction.

Certain Native American tribes of the Inocoplo family in Texas referred to themselves as "mulatto". At one time, Florida's laws declared that a person from any number of mixed ancestries would be legally defined as a mulatto, including White/Hispanic, Black/Native American, and just about any other mix as well.

In the United States, due to the influence and laws making slavery a racial caste, and later practices of hypodescent, white colonists and settlers tended to classify persons of mixed African and Native American ancestry as black, regardless of how they identified themselves, or sometimes as Black Indians. But many tribes had matrilineal kinship systems and practices of absorbing other peoples into their cultures. Multiracial children born to Native American mothers were customarily raised in her family and specific tribal culture. Federally recognized Native American tribes have insisted that identity and membership is related to culture rather than race, and that individuals brought up within tribal culture are fully members, regardless of whether they also have some European or African ancestry. Many tribes have had mixed-race members who identify primarily as members of the tribes.

If the multiracial children were born to slave women (generally of at least partial African descent), they were classified under slave law as slaves. This was to the advantage of slaveowners, as Indian slavery had been abolished. If mixed-race children were born to Native American mothers, they should be considered free, but sometimes slaveholders kept them in slavery anyway. Multiracial children born to slave mothers were generally raised within the African-American community and considered "black".

Contemporary era

Mulatto was used as an official census racial category in the United States, to acknowledge multiracial persons, until 1930. (In the early 20th century, several southern states had adopted the one-drop rule as law, and southern Congressmen pressed the US Census Bureau to drop the mulatto category: they wanted all persons to be classified as "black" or "white".)

In the 2000 United States census, 6,171 Americans self-identified as having mulatto ancestry. Since then, persons responding to the census have been allowed to identify as having more than one type of ethnic ancestry.

Colonial references
Basters
Fernandino
Quadroon – and other terms denoting the degree of African descent
Métis
Mestizo
Zambo
Creole peoples

See also

African diaspora in the Americas
Afro-Brazilians
Afro-Colombians
Afro-Latin Americans
Afro-Mexicans
Afro-Argentines
Cafres
Cassare, a marriage alliance between European traders and African rulers.
Casta
Cholo
Coloureds
Free people of color
Melungeon
Multiracial
Rhineland Bastard
Tragic mulatto

References
Notes

Citations

Further reading

 Beckmann, Susan. "The mulatto of style: language in Derek Walcott's drama." Canadian Drama 6.1 (1980): 71-89. online
  
  
  
 
 
  Engseng Ho, an anthropologist, discusses the role of the muwallad in the region. The term muwallad, used primarily in reference to those of "mixed blood", is analyzed through ethnographic and textual information.

External links

 A Brief History of Census “Race”
 Surprises in the Family Tree
 The Mulatto Factor in Black Family Genealogy
 Dr. David Pilgrim, "The Tragic Mulatto Myth", Jim Crow Museum, Ferris State University 
 At "Race Relations", in-depth research links on Mulattoes, About.com 
 Encarta's breakdown of Mulatto people (Archived 2009-11-01)
 

 
African–Native American relations
Ethnic groups in Latin America
Ethnic groups in the United States
Latin American caste system
Multiracial affairs
Anti-black racism
Ethnic and religious slurs
Anti-African and anti-black slurs